Santón (possibly from Quechua for Puya raimondii) is a  mountain in the southern Cordillera Blanca in the Andes of Peru. It is located in the Ancash Region, Recuay Province, Catac District. It is situated northeast of Caullaraju and north of Challhua. Santón lies south of Pumapampa River, a right tributary of the Santa River.

References 

Mountains of Peru
Mountains of Ancash Region